William Keane is an Irish former hurler who played as a left corner-back for the Offaly senior team.

Born in Banagher, County Offaly, Keane first played competitive hurling in his youth. He made his senior debut with Offaly during the 1984-85 National League, but was dropped from the team before the championship. During his brief career he experienced little success.

At club level Keane is a one-time Leinster medallist with St Rynagh's. He also won numerous championship medals with the club.

Honours
St Rynagh's
Leinster Senior Club Hurling Championship (1): 1982

References

Living people
St Rynagh's hurlers
Offaly inter-county hurlers
Year of birth missing (living people)